was a Japanese cross-country skier who competed from 1993 to 1998. Competing in two Winter Olympics, he earned his best career and individual finishes at Nagano in 1998 with a seventh in the 4 x 10 km relay and 33rd in the 50 km event, respectively.

Nagahama's best finish at the FIS Nordic World Ski Championships was 33rd in the 10 km + 15 km combined pursuit at Thunder Bay, Ontario in 1995. His best World Cup finish was 31st twice at various distances in 1995.

Nagahama's best individual career finish was fourth in a 30 km FIS Race event in Finland in 1996.

External links

Olympic 4 x 10 km relay results: 1936-2002 

1969 births
Living people
Cross-country skiers at the 1994 Winter Olympics
Cross-country skiers at the 1998 Winter Olympics
Japanese male cross-country skiers
Universiade medalists in cross-country skiing
Universiade gold medalists for Japan
Competitors at the 1991 Winter Universiade
Competitors at the 1993 Winter Universiade
Olympic cross-country skiers of Japan